Brian Phillip Buscher (born April 18, 1981), nicknamed "The Urban Legend," is a former Major League Baseball third baseman. He served in 2011 as the undergraduate assistant coach for the South Carolina Gamecocks baseball team.

Professional career
Drafted by the San Francisco Giants in the 3rd round (93rd overall) of the 2003 Major League Baseball Draft, Buscher spent 2003–2006 in the Giants farm system, reaching as high as Double-A with the Connecticut Defenders. In December 2006, he was taken by the Twins in the Rule 5 Draft.  The Twins purchased his contract on July 26, 2007, and Buscher made his major league debut on July 27, 2007.  Buscher finished the 2007 season with a .244 batting average, 2 home runs, and 10 runs batted in over the course of 33 games.

During the 2008 season, Buscher did not make the opening day roster and started with the Twins' AAA affiliate Rochester Red Wings. He was later called up to the Twins on April 20 and sent back on April 30 after batting .250 in 8 at-bats. Buscher was recalled again on June 12, taking former Twins reliever Juan Rincón's roster spot.  At the time of his recall, Buscher was batting .328 (58-for-177) with 12 doubles, seven home runs and 27 RBI in 51 games for the Red Wings. Upon arriving in Minneapolis, Justin Morneau took Buscher under his wing, allowing him to stay at him apartment and showing him how things worked in the major leagues. After his June callup, Buscher replaced struggling veteran Mike Lamb as the everyday third baseman and earned the nickname "The Urban Legend" while batting .294 with 47 runs batted in over that stint.

In 2009, Buscher played sparingly, appearing in 61 games, making 136 at-bats with a batting average of .235 and serving as a platoon DH alongside Brendan Harris. Buscher did not make the Twins 2009 playoff roster. He was outrighted off the 40-man on November 3, 2009,

On December 2, 2009, Buscher signed a minor league deal with the Cleveland Indians with an invitation to Spring Training. He did not make the major league club and was assigned to minor league camp on April 2. After spending the first half of the season with the Triple-A Columbus Clippers, Buscher was transferred to the Short-Season A Mahoning Valley Scrappers on June 13. He was transferred back to the Clippers and released from the Indians' organization on June 29. He went on to be manager of the Columbia Blowfish.

References

External links

1981 births
Living people
Minnesota Twins players
Baseball players from Jacksonville, Florida
Major League Baseball third basemen
South Carolina Gamecocks baseball players
Hagerstown Suns players
San Jose Giants players
Norwich Navigators players
Connecticut Defenders players
New Britain Rock Cats players
Rochester Red Wings players
Columbus Clippers players
College of Central Florida Patriots baseball players